Heinrich Otto (6 July 1858, Homberg - 13 May 1923, Düsseldorf) was a German painter, lithographer, woodcut artist, and etcher.

Life and work 

He was the second child born to Johannes Otto (1828–1889), a farmer and fruit seller, and his wife, Anna Gertrude née Scheibeler. At the age of fourteen, he began an apprenticeship as a sculptor, in Kassel.

In 1889, he moved to Düsseldorf, and lived next door to the Kunstakademie. He also became associated with the progressive artists' group, Malkasten, which included some of the painters he had known at Willingshäuser. From 1898 to 1902, he was one of their Board members and took numerous painting trips throughout Germany. In 1901, he was awarded Dresden's "Goldene Staatsmedaille" for his lithograph, Mondnacht (moon night), which gained him a wider audience among private collectors. From 1903, he worked as a painting and drawing teacher for young women. His summers were often spent in Willingshäuser.

The farmhouse became a frequent meeting place for painters from the Willingshäuser colony. He continued to paint prolifically, adding harvests to his repertoire of themes. After the war, some his designs went to make up the "Hessenkunst-Kalendar" for 1920. He returned to Düsseldorf, where he had been appointed a Professor at the Kunstakademie, and died there in 1923, shortly before he would have turned sixty-five, from pneumonia.

Sources 
 Carl Bantzer: "Heinrich Otto", In: Christian Rauch (Ed.), Hessenkunst. Marburg, 1920, pg.49
 Walter Cohen, "Otto, Heinrich", In: Allgemeines Lexikon der Bildenden Künstler von der Antike bis zur Gegenwart, Vol. 26: Olivier–Pieris, E. A. Seemann, Leipzig 1932
 Ernst Hager: Der Malerradierer Heinrich Otto, Bagel Verlag, Düsseldorf, 1923.
 Wilhelm Schäfer. "Heinrich Otto"", In: Die Rheinlande, #8, vol.4, April 1908, pp.89–90
 : "Heinrich Otto", In: Ingeborg Schnack (Ed.), Lebensbilder aus Kurhessen und Waldeck, Vol.2, Elwert-Braun, Marburg, 1940.
 Rainer Zimmermann: "Heinrich Otto – Maler und Radierer", In: Hessische Heimat, #9, 1959/60, Vol.1, pp. 16–18

External links 

 
 "Heinrich Otto und die Willingshäuser Malerkolonie" @ Kunststation Kleinsassen

1858 births
1923 deaths
19th-century German painters
19th-century German male artists
German etchers
German lithographers
Academic staff of Kunstakademie Düsseldorf
Deaths from pneumonia in Germany
People from Homberg (Efze)
20th-century German painters
20th-century German male artists